Gasp is a 2009 Chinese film directed by Zheng Zhong.

Cast
 John Savage
 Liang Tian
 Kelly Lin
 Ge You
 Wilson Chen
 Liu Hua (刘桦)
 Zhang Qiufang
 Li Jing
 Ji Lianhai
 Kerry Berry Brogan

References

External links
 
 Gasp (氣喘吁吁 aka 不見不散2 and 淘金駭客) (2009) at the Hong Kong Movie Database

2009 films
2000s Mandarin-language films
Chinese comedy-drama films
2009 comedy-drama films
2009 comedy films
2009 drama films